John Barton is an English former professional rugby league footballer who played in the 1950s and 1960s.

Playing career

International honours
John Barton won caps for Great Britain while at Wigan in 1960 against France, and in 1961 against New Zealand.

Championship final appearances
John Barton played left-, i.e. number 8, in Wigan's 27-3 victory over Wakefield Trinity in the Championship Final during the 1959–60 season at Odsal, Bradford on Saturday 21 May 1960.

Challenge Cup Final appearances
John Barton played left-, i.e. number 8, and scored a try in Wigan's 13–9 victory over Workington Town in the 1958 Challenge Cup Final during the 1957–58 season at Wembley Stadium, London on Saturday 10 May 1958, in front of a crowd of 66,109, and played right-, i.e. number 10, in the 30-13 victory over Hull F.C. in the 1959 Challenge Cup Final during the 1958–59 season at Wembley Stadium, London on Saturday 9 May 1959, in front of a crowd of 79,811.

County League appearances
John Barton played in Wigan's victories in the Lancashire County League during the 1958–59 season and 1961–62 season.

References

External links
!Great Britain Statistics at englandrl.co.uk (statistics currently missing due to not having appeared for both Great Britain, and England)

Living people
English rugby league players
Great Britain national rugby league team players
Leigh Leopards players
Rugby league players from Wigan
Rugby league props
Wigan Warriors players
Year of birth missing (living people)